The Ports of the United States handle more than 2 billion metric tons of domestic and import/export cargo annually. U.S. ports handle a wide variety of goods that are critical to the global economy, including petroleum, grain, steel, automobiles, and containerized goods. Reports from individual ports indicate that approximately 4.6 million automobiles (imports and exports) passed through American ports in 2006.

Employment 

Total port-related employment in the United States was estimated at 8.4 million people in 2006. Of this total, 1.4 million were employed in providing goods and services to ports (such as longshore, stevedore, and security personnel).  The remaining 7 million were employed in import- and export-related activities (such as transportation, warehousing, and distribution).  Port activities were also responsible for bringing in $102.8 billion in federal, state and local taxes in 2006.

Growth 

Unusually, United States containerized trade rates fell in 2007 despite a continued rise in international container rates. Inbound container volumes to the United States fell by 1.1 percent in 2007 to 18.96 million TEU. This compares to growth rates of 8.6 percent in 2006 and 10.5 percent in 2005. The decline was centered on transatlantic trade, with transpacific container volumes increasing by 0.4 percent over 2006.

The Foreign Dredge Act of 1906 bans foreign-built and foreign-owned dredges from operating in the United states. This has been cited by critics such as the Heritage Foundation and the Cato Institute as being responsible for constraining the growth of US ports, such as the inability of some major US ports to accommodate post-Panamax ships.

See also
 Dubai Ports World controversy
 List of ports in the United States
 United States container ports

References

External links
Seaport Governance  
Marine Terminal Operators